This is a list of hills in the Lake District. To avoid the list becoming infinitely long and arbitrary, only hills with more than 30 m relative height (rising over ) are included. This includes most, but not all, Wainwrights as well as many other hills.

Topographically, the boundaries of the Lake District trace the flow of streams from the lowest point between it and the Pennines. This occurs just north of the Howgill Fells and gives the boundaries as, primarily, the River Eden and River Lune. This list therefore includes all hills to the west of those rivers including the so-called 'Westmorland Plateau' to the north of the Howgills.

Hills are grouped as topographically as possible, according to their 'parent Marilyn'. The parent Marilyn of hill A can be found by dividing the nearby area into territories, by tracing the runoff from the key col of each Marilyn. The parent is the Marilyn whose territory hill A resides in. Marilyns are given in bold-faced font.

In the table headers, H stands for height and RH for relative height.

Northern Fells

North Western Fells

Western Fells

Central Fells

Mid-Western Fells

Eastern Fells

Far Eastern Fells

Lake District
Hills